Thea Minyan Bjørseth (born 30 October 2003) is a Norwegian ski jumper and Nordic combined skier. She participated at the team event at the FIS Nordic World Ski Championships 2021, winning the bronze medal.

References

External links
 
 

Living people
2003 births
Norwegian female Nordic combined skiers
FIS Nordic World Ski Championships medalists in ski jumping
Nordic combined skiers at the 2020 Winter Youth Olympics
Norwegian female ski jumpers
Norwegian people of Thai descent
Ski jumpers at the 2022 Winter Olympics
Olympic ski jumpers of Norway
21st-century Norwegian women